Jefferson B.A. Knox is an American golfer. A member of Augusta National Golf Club, he currently serves as the marker for the Masters golf tournament. He is the 1998 champion of the Azalea Invitational amateur tournament.  Knox is a prior board member of the University of Georgia Foundation and the First Bank of Georgia. Knox was born in Thomson, Georgia, attending Thomson High School, and the University of Georgia, earning a degree in finance in 1984.

References

American male golfers
Living people
Year of birth missing (living people)